Nahr-e Ariz (also Romanized as Nahr-e ‘Arīẕ) is a village in Nasar Rural District, Arvandkenar District, Abadan County, Khuzestan Province, Iran. At the 2006 census, its population was 210, in 41 families.

References 

Populated places in Abadan County